The 1982 Swedish Open was a men's professional tennis tournament played on outdoor clay courts and held in Båstad, Sweden. It was part of the 1982 Grand Prix circuit. It was the 35th edition of the tournament and was held from 12 July through 19 July  1982. First-seeded Mats Wilander won the singles title.

Finals

Singles

 Mats Wilander defeated  Henrik Sundström 6–4, 6–4
 It was Wilander's 2nd singles title of the year and of his career.

Doubles

 Anders Jarryd /  Hans Simonsson  defeated  Joakim Nystrom /  Mats Wilander 0–6, 6–3, 7–6

References

External links
 ITF tournament edition details

Swedish Open
Swedish Open
Swedish Open
Swedish Open